The Anglo-Saxon Review was a quarterly miscellany edited by Lady Randolph Churchill, and published in London by John Lane. It was short lived, running from June 1899 to September 1901. Churchill's son, Winston Churchill, was one of her devoted advisors during the months preceding publication. He suggested that the magazine take as its purpose "to preserve a permanent record of the thoughts and aspirations of our times, which vary as swiftly as light changes on running water, for wiser ages yet unborn."

It contained articles by Henry James, Winston Churchill, George Gissing, Stephen Crane, Henry De Vere Stacpoole, Robert Barr, Henry Duff Traill, Henry Swinburne, Ethel Rolt Wheeler, Henry Watson Fowler and Frank Swettenham. Each issue was individually decorated in an elaborate pattern of gilt tooling on leather covers. The subscription list included heads of state, royalty, and some of the wealthiest families of Britain and the United States. Many of the magazine's contributors, too, were members of the nobility, officers of the Church of England, members of parliament, titled servants of the crown, and foreign dignitaries.

A fictional account of the magazine's creation is provided by Robin Paige in the novel Death at Whitechapel.

References

External links 
 Catalog of the Anglo-Saxon Review

1899 establishments in the United Kingdom
1901 disestablishments in the United Kingdom
Quarterly magazines published in the United Kingdom
Defunct literary magazines published in the United Kingdom
Magazines established in 1899
Magazines disestablished in 1901
Magazines published in London